Ismay Andrews was one of the earliest major teachers of African dance in the United States. Her career started in 1929 as a stage actress, and she taught dance in community centers in New York City from 1934 to 1959.

Stage actor 
Andrews began her career in as an actor in stage plays in New York City. These included a musical comedy, Great Day, at the Cosmopolitan Theatre in 1929, Ol' Man Satan in 1932, and the operetta Africana in 1934. She also appeared in a 1932 film, The Black King.

Dance 
In the early 1930s, Andrews studied dance under Asadata Dafora. People in the United States in this era largely regarded Africans as savage and animalistic, and Dafora was part of bringing an awareness of their humanity and an appreciation for their culture. The new interest in African music and dance offered a new positive black identity rooted in ancient, pre-colonial traditions. This movement in art and culture was connected to the Harlem Renaissance and the Négritude movement.

Andrews taught in New York community centers from 1934 to 1959. She began teaching African dance at the Abyssinian Baptist Church in Harlem in 1934. This makes her one of the earliest major teachers of African dance in the United States, along with Efiom Odok and Dafora. She also taught at Mother African Methodist Episcopal Zion Church, which was one of the primary centers of African American culture in New York City at the time. 

Her students included Chief Bey, Pearl Primus, Coleridge-Taylor Perkinson,, Alice Dinizulu, Alexandreena Dixon, Eartha Kitt, Eleo Pomare, Bea Richards (later a prominent actress), and Brunilda Ruiz.

Ismay Andrews never traveled to Africa, but learned African traditions through researching in public libraries.

1940s 
In the 1940s, Andrews focused on the dances of East Africa. She founded and directed a dance company known as the Swa-Hili Dancers who performed re-constructed East African dances. They performed on stage at the Stage Door Canteen, in cabarets, and for the USO during World War II. 

The African American community in Harlem strongly supported Andrews cultural work throughout her career.

Recognition 
In May 1971, in a formal ceremony, the Modern Organization for Dance Evolvement (MODE), founded by  Carole Johnson and others in New York, awarded Andrews their inaugural dance award for "a person who contributed lo the black experience in dance".

Death
She died in poverty in New York City.

See also 
 African-American art#The Harlem Renaissance to contemporary art
 African-American culture
 African-American dance
 Caterina Jarboro
 Josephine Baker
 Marcus Garvey
 Zora Neale Hurston

Notes

Citations

References

Further reading 

  
 
 Dixon Gottschild, B. (1996). Digging the Africanist presence in American performance. Westport, CT: Greenwood Press
 Garafola, L. (Ed). (1994). Of, by, and for the people: Dancing on the left in the 1930s. Madison, WI: AR Editions, Inc
 
 Long, R. (1989). The Black tradition in American dance. New York: Rizzoli International Publications.
 Malone, J. (1996). Steppin’ on the blues: The visible rhythms of African American dance. Chicago: University of Illinois Press.
 Maureen Needham, “Kykunkor, or the Witch Woman: An African Opera in America, 1934,” in Dancing Many Drums: Excavations in African Dance, edited by Thomas F. DeFrantz, Madison, Wisconsin: The University of Wisconsin Press, 2002.
 Prevots, N. (1998), Dance for export: Cultural diplomacy and the Cold War. Hanover, NH: University Press o f New England.
 Sherrod, E.G. (1998). The dance griots: An examination of the dance pedagogy of Katherine Dunham and Black pioneering dancers in Chicago and New York City from 1931-1946. Dissertation Abstracts International, 463. (UMI No. 9826197)
 
 
 

21st-century American actresses
21st-century American dancers
Actresses from New York City
African-American actresses
African-American choreographers
American choreographers
African-American cultural history
African-American female dancers
African-American history between emancipation and the civil rights movement
African-American history in New York City
African and Black nationalism in the United States
African and Black nationalists
American film actresses
American musical theatre actresses
American stage actresses
American women choreographers
Dance in Africa
Dance in New York City
Dancers from New York (state)
Harlem Renaissance
Musical theatre female dancers

People from Harlem
21st-century African-American women singers